Moonstone is an unincorporated community in Oro-Medonte, a township in Simcoe County, Ontario, Canada. Moonstone is located 20 minutes north of Barrie and 15 minutes from Orillia. Moonstone is also accessible via Highway 400, and is a popular destination for skiers, snowboarders and winter enthusiasts visiting nearby Mount St. Louis Moonstone Ski Resort. The community has an elementary school and a community park which includes basketball courts, climbing structures, swings, and a football field. The community hosts a variety of annual events including a Santa Claus parade and an Easter egg hunt.

Communities in Simcoe County